The Productivity Commission is the Australian Government's principal review and advisory body on microeconomic policy, regulation and a range of other social and environmental issues.

The Productivity Commission was created as an independent authority by the Productivity Commission Act 1998, an Act of the Australian Parliament.

The Commission operates within the Treasury portfolio and its core function involves responding to references from the Treasurer, which can request a commissioned study or a public inquiry. References to the Commission stipulate the length and terms of the project and may cover any sector of the Australian economy; address a particular industry or cut across industry boundaries; and involve wider social or environmental issues.

Most projects are specified for nine or twelve-month duration, although some may be six or fifteen months. Both studies and inquiries accept submissions from members of the public, although inquiries are additionally required (under the Act) to undertake formal public consultations. All reports are publicly released.

In addition, the Commission acts as the secretariat to the intergovernmental  Review of Government Service Provision, and produces annually the Report on Government Services, as well as regular reports that contribute to a better understanding of the effectiveness of government services provided to Aboriginal and Torres Strait Islander peoples.

The Commission can undertake self-initiated research, and operates as the Australian Government's competitive neutrality complaints mechanism.

Productivity Commission reports often form the basis of government policy. However, the Commission does not administer government programs or exercise executive power and governments are not required to act on its recommendations; although in practice, many recommendations are accepted.

History

Predecessor agencies

Timeline
The Commission traces its lineage back to the Tariff Board, which was established in the 1920s. On 1 January 1974, the Tariff Board became the Industries Assistance Commission and then in 1989 it became the Industry Commission.

The Productivity Commission was created as an independent authority in April 1998 by the Productivity Commission Act 1998, and replaced the Industry Commission, the Bureau of Industry Economics and the Economic Planning Advisory Commission. These three bodies were amalgamated on an administrative basis in 1996.

The Commission's remit may extend beyond Australia, such as when the Commission worked jointly with the New Zealand Productivity Commission on a study into Trans-Tasman Economic Relations in 2012 and in a 2019 report on Growing the Digital Economy in Australia and New Zealand.

Chairs of the Productivity Commission

Deputy Chairs of the Productivity Commission

Commissioners of the Productivity Commission

Operation
The Commission is headed by a Chairperson and between 4 and 12 other Commissioners, who are appointed by the Governor-General for periods up to five years. Some commissioners are required to have particular skills and experience:

(a) in applying the principles of ecologically sustainable development and environmental conservation

(b) in dealing with the social effects of economic adjustment and social welfare service delivery

(c) acquired in working in Australian industry

(d) dealing with policies and programs that have an impact on Indigenous persons and dealing with one or more communities of Indigenous persons.

Associate Commissioners can be appointed by the Treasurer on a full or part-time basis. Commission staff are Commonwealth public servants. The average number of employees in the 2021-22 financial year was 164.

The Commission reports formally through the Treasurer to the Australian Parliament, where its inquiry reports are tabled. Final inquiry reports must be tabled in Parliament within 25 sitting days of the Government receiving the report.

What makes the Commission unusual among public sector institutions around the world is the combination of three core principles which it embodies:

 Independence — The commission operates under the protection and guidelines of its own legislation. It has an arm's length relationship with the Government. While the Government largely determines its work program, it cannot tell it what to say and the commission's findings and recommendations are based on its own analyses and judgments.
 Transparency — The commission's advice to government, and the information and analysis on which it is based, are open to public scrutiny. Its processes provide for extensive public input and feedback through hearings, workshops and other consultative forums, and through the release of draft reports and preliminary findings.
 A community-wide focus — The commission is obliged under its statutory guidelines to take a broad view, encompassing the interests of the economy and community as a whole, rather than just particular industries or groups. Environmental, regional and social dimensions of its work are also considered, informed by public consultation and the commission's own research capability.

References

External links
 Productivity Commission website
 Productivity Commission Twitter feed
 Productivity Commission Facebook page
 Productivity Commission YouTube channel
 Productivity Commission LinkedIn channel

Economy of Australia
Commonwealth Government agencies of Australia
1996 establishments in Australia
Government agencies established in 1996
Productivity organizations